Emmanuelle Auriol (born 5 December 1966 in Toulouse) is a French economist. She is chair of the Women in Economics (WinE) Committee.

Biography
Auriol is an IDEI researcher, a member of the Toulouse School of Economics (TSE) and professor of economics at the University of Aix-Marseille (1996-1997) and Toulouse I (1998-). She is mainly devoted to the study of the regulation and organization theory, including industrial organization and the economics of development.

Auriol is a regular contributor to Le Monde and the economic press.

In 2015, as a solution to the problems posed by illegal immigration, Auriol proposed in Liberation to "legalize economic immigration by selling visas to people who wish to work with us." She is a fellow of the European Economic Association.

Awards
 1996: Prize of the French Association of Banks
 2002: Nominated for the Best Young Economist of France, the newspaper Le Monde
 2003 Bronze Medal of the CNRS (Centre national de la recherche scientifique)
 2003: Junior member of the Institut Universitaire de France
 2009: Elected member of the Council of European Economic Association
 2009-2012: ANR Research Grant on public procurement and capture rents - in the case of Paraguay

Other activities
 Cercle des économistes, Member

Personal life
Auriol is married and has two children.

Publications
 « Public Procurement and Rent-Seeking: The Case of Paraguay », IDEI Working Paper, no 661, 18 février 2011.(avec Thomas Flochel (University of Edinburgh) et Stéphane Straub (TSE))[ Texte complet (Fichier PDF, 477 Ko) ]
 « Economic Integration and Investment Incentives in Regulated Industries », IDEI Working Paper, no 555, mai 2009.(avec Sara Biancini)[ Texte complet (Fichier PDF) ]
 « Public Private Partnerships in Water and Electricity in Africa », Agence Française de Développement, no 38, janvier 2007.(avec Aymeric Blanc) [ Texte complet (Fichier PDF, 179 Ko) ]
 « Privatizations in Developing Countries and the Government's Budget Constraint », IDEI Working Paper, no 459, mai 2004.(avec Pierre M. Picard)[ Texte complet (Fichier PDF, 335 Ko) ]
 « Quality Signaling through Certification. Theory and an Application to Agricultural Seed Market », IDEI Working Paper, no 165, 2003.(avec Steven G.M. Schilizzi)[ Texte complet (Fichier PDF, 456 Ko) | Résumé (Fichier PDF, 41 Ko) ]
 « The Costs and Benefits of Symbolic Differentiation in the Work Place », IDEI Working Paper, no 101, 2000, révision 2002.(avec Régis Renault)[ Texte complet (Fichier PDF, 648 Ko) | Résumé (Fichier PDF, 61 Ko) ]

Articles in journals 
 « Education and Migration Choices in Hierarchical Societies: The Case of Matam, Senegal », Regional Science and Urban Economics. doi:10.1016/j.regsciurbeco.2012.04.005.(avec Jean-Luc Demonsant (Universidad Autonoma de Nuevo León))[ Texte complet (Fichier PDF, 406 Ko) ]
 « On the Optimal Number of Representatives », Public Choice. doi:10.1007/s11127-011-9801-3.(avec Robert J. Gary-Bobo)[ Version finale_Document de travail (Fichier PDF, 407 Ko) ]
 « A Theory of BOT Concession Contracts », Journal of Economic Behavior and Organization. doi:10.1016/j.jebo.2011.10.003.(avec Pierre M. Picard)[ Texte complet (Fichier PDF, 308 Ko) ]
 « The Marginal Cost of Public Funds and Tax Reform in Africa », Journal of Development Economics, vol. 97, no 1, janvier 2012, p. 58-72. doi:10.1016/j.jdeveco.2011.01.003.(avec Michael Warlters)[ Version finale_Document de travail (Fichier PDF, 509 Ko) | CGE model of "The marginal cost of public funds and tax reform in Africa" (30 Ko) ]
 « Government Outsourcing: Public Contracting with Private Monopoly », The Economic Journal, vol. 119, no 540, octobre 2009, p. 1464-1493. doi:10.1111/j.1468-0297.2009.02291.x.(avec Pierre M. Picard)
 « Capture and Corruption in Public Utilities: the Cases of Water and Electricity in Sub-Saharan Africa », Utilities Policy, vol. 17, no 2, juin 2009, p. 203-216.(avec Aymeric Blanc)
 « Infrastructure and Public Utilities Privatization in Developing Countries », The World Bank Economic Review, vol. 23, no 1, 2009, p. 77-100. doi:10.1093/wber/lhn014.(avec Pierre M. Picard)
 « Status and Incentives », The RAND Journal of Economics, vol. 39, no 1, Spring 2008, p. 305-326.(avec Régis Renault)
 « On Robust Constitution Design », Theory and Decision, vol. 62, no 3, mai 2007, p. 241-279.(avec Robert J. Gary-Bobo)
 « Corruption in Procurement and Public Purchase », International Journal of Industrial Organization, vol. 24, no 5, septembre 2006, p. 867-885.
 « Telecommunication Reforms in Developing Countries », Communications & Strategies, Special Issue, IDATE, Montpellier, novembre 2005, p. 31-53.
 « Taxation Base in Developing Countries », Journal of Public Economics, vol. 89, no 4, Special Issue: Cornell - ISPE Conference on Public Finance and Development, avril 2005, p. 625-646. doi:10.1016/j.jpubeco.2004.04.008.(avec Michael Warlters)
 The explosive combination of religious decentralization and autocracy: The case of Islam, 
Sale of visas: A smuggler’s final song?
Government outsourcing: Public contracting with private monopoly

See also 

List of economists

References

External links 
http://blogs.worldbank.org/team/emmanuelle-auriol

French women economists
French economists
1966 births
Living people
Fellows of the European Economic Association